Bak Sheut-sin (born 19 May 1928 in Guangzhou, Guangdong, China), also known as Bai Xuexian, is a former Chinese opera actress in China and Hong Kong.

Career
Bak is notable for pairing up with fellow Cantonese opera star Yam Kim Fai. Two of her major works are The Peony Pavilion and Tai Nui Fa. She has received awards from The Hong Kong Academy for Performing Arts and Hong Kong University for her contribution to the opera art form. In April 2001 she received a "Lifetime achievement award" from the Hong Kong Film Awards from Chief Secretary for Administration Anson Chan.  Awarded Gold Bauhinia Star by the Hong Kong Government in 2013.

See also
Yam Kim Fai

External links

1928 births
20th-century Hong Kong actresses
Actresses from Guangzhou
Living people
Hong Kong Cantonese opera actresses
Musicians from Guangzhou
Singers from Guangdong
20th-century Hong Kong women singers
Hong Kong idols